The Worst Poetry of 1986–1993 is a compilation by Bewitched, released in 2006 by B.B Gun. Released over a decade after the band's demise, the album compiles tracks taken from singles coupled with songs from the band's two studio albums, all of which were remastered by Wharton Tiers. The cover art pays homage to the independently produced and recorded vanity records of the 1960s, such as the infamous Philosophy of the World by The Shaggs.

Track listing

Personnel 
Adapted from The Worst Poetry of 1986-1993 liner notes.

Bewitched
 Bob Bert – drums, lead vocals (1, 3, 5, 7, 8, 10), tape (11, 12), marimba (12)
 Donna Croughn – violin (6, 8, 9), bass guitar (8), vocals (8)
 DJ David Cream of Wheat P – turntables (1-7, 9)
 Jim Fu – electric guitar (1-4, 6, 9)
 Chris Ward – bass guitar (1-7, 9)
Additional musicians
 Peter Aaron – electric guitar (11, 12)
 Mark Cunningham – trumpet (11)
 Tad Doyle – spoken word (6)
 Daisy von Firth – backing vocals (7)
 Thurston Moore – spoken word (6)

Additional musicians (cont.)
 Art Reinitz – electric guitar (11)
 Dave Rick – electric guitar (11, 12), bass guitar (11, 12)
 Suzanne Sasic – vocals (12)
 Jerry Teel – bass guitar (10)
 William Weber – electric guitar (10)
Production and additional personnel
 Steve Albini – recording (3, 5, 7)
 Roli Mosimann – mixing (11, 12)
 J. G. Thirlwell – mixing (11, 12)
 Wharton Tiers – remastering, recording (1, 2, 6, 7, 9, 11, 12)
 Mark Venezia – recording (10)
 Peter Ziebel – cover art

Release history

References

External links 
 The Worst Poetry of 1986-1993 at Discogs (list of releases)

2006 compilation albums
Bewitched (American band) albums